Resident Advisors is an American sitcom that premiered on April 9, 2015, on Hulu. The series was created by Alex J. Reid, Taylor Jenkins Reid, and Natalia Anderson and follows a group of resident advisors at a college.

Synopsis
The show follows group of resident advisors in a college dormitory.

Cast and characters

Main
Ryan Hansen as Doug Weiner, a 30-something resident advisor (RA) who is pursuing his fifth master's degree.
Jamie Chung as Olivia Blunt, the no-nonsense Residence Director of Hutcherson Dormitory with aspirations of moving to Silicon Valley.
Andrew Bachelor as Sam Parker, a smart and competent RA who is putting himself through college. 
Juliette Goglia as Rachel Cunningham, a female freshman who grew up in a polygamist family, and assigned to room with Leslie, a male student.
Alison Rich as Amy Willard, a quirky and self-conscious RA who loves dogs.
Graham Rogers as Tyler Stone, the girl-crazy and testosterone-fueled RA in Hutcherson.
Daryl Sabara as Leslie Flowers, a male student who is accidentally roomed with a female resident, Rachel.

Recurring
Romy Rosemont as Dean Berber
Jacob Wysocki as Jack, Charles
Vanessa Lengies as Marissa Penson-Weiner, Doug Weiner's ex-girlfriend who is not over him
Esther Povitsky as Emily White
Matt Shively as Mike Shelton
David Del Rio as Ian
Echo Kellum as Campus Security Officer Dillerson

Guest starring
Ryan Malgarini as Beep Hutcherson, the benefactor of Hutcherson Dorm
Alex Newell as Morgan, a genderfluid freshman
Chrissie Fit as Squatting Resident
Hana Mae Lee as PJ (Paula-Jean)
Anna Camp as Constance Renfro
Michael Blaiklock as Rooster
Nicole Byer as Kiki
Colton Dunn as Fill-In Doug Weiner
Jayma Mays as Dr. Michaela Roberts
Elizabeth Banks as Leslie's Penis Doctor
Brea Grant as Olivia's Bitchy Friend
Kelley Jakle as Girl Leslie
Jeff Meacham as Fred Flaterman

Episodes

References

External links
 

Hulu original programming
2010s American college television series
2010s American single-camera sitcoms
2015 American television series debuts
2015 American television series endings
English-language television shows
Television series by Brownstone Productions